The New School for Social Research (NSSR) is a graduate-level educational institution that is one of the divisions of The New School in New York City, United States. The university was founded in 1919 as a home for progressive era thinkers. NSSR explores and promotes what they describe as global peace and global justice. It enrolls more than 1,000 students from all regions of the United States and from more than 70 countries.

History
The New School for Social Research was founded in 1919 by, among others, Charles Beard, John Dewey, James Harvey Robinson, and Thorstein Veblen. In 1933, what became known as the University in Exile, had become a haven for scholars who had been dismissed from teaching positions by the Italian fascists under Benito Mussolini or had to flee Adolf Hitler and the Nazi Party. The University in Exile was initially founded by the director of the New School, Alvin Saunders Johnson, through the financial contributions of Hiram Halle and the Rockefeller Foundation.

The University in Exile and its subsequent incarnations have been the intellectual heart of the New School. Notable scholars associated with the University in Exile include psychologists Erich Fromm and Max Wertheimer, political philosophers Hannah Arendt and Leo Strauss, social psychologist Everett Dean Martin, philosophers Aron Gurwitsch, Hans Jonas, and Reiner Schürmann, sociologists Alfred Schutz, Peter L. Berger, and Arthur Vidich, economists Adolph Lowe and Robert Heilbroner, and historians Charles Tilly and Louise Tilly.

Following the collapse of totalitarian regimes in Europe, the University in Exile was renamed the Graduate Faculty of Political and Social Science. In 1964 John R. Everett became the President of the New School for Social Research, which position he held until he retired in 1982. Harry Gideonse was Chancellor of the New School for Social Research from 1966 until 1975, when he retired.

In 1997 the school was renamed New School University.  It was renamed the "New School for Social Research" in 2005, returning to the original name of the university. Its various colleges were regrouped under various names such as College of Performing Arts (taking on the existing music, jazz and drama schools), Eugene Lang College The New School for Liberal Arts, Parsons School of Design and The New School for Public Engagement (taking on Milano School of International Affairs, Management, and Urban Policy, plus media studies, language studies and other programs). The university also continued with a separate new institution The New School for Social Research under the general banner of The New School.

References

The New School
Educational institutions established in 1919
Liberal arts colleges in New York City
New York City Designated Landmarks in Manhattan
New York City interior landmarks
Universities and colleges in New York City